Angus, Thongs and Perfect Snogging (also known as Angus, Thongs and Full-Frontal Snogging) is a 2008 teen romantic comedy film co-written and directed by Gurinder Chadha, based on the young adult novels Angus, Thongs and Full-Frontal Snogging (1999) and It's OK, I'm Wearing Really Big Knickers (2000) by Louise Rennison. The film stars Georgia Groome, Alan Davies, Karen Taylor, Aaron Johnson and Eleanor Tomlinson. The plot follows 14-year-old Georgia Nicholson (Groome) as she tries to find a boyfriend while also organising her 15th-birthday party.

Plot
Fourteen-year-old Georgia lives in Eastbourne with her parents Connie and Bob and little sister Libby. She is insecure about her appearance and fears she will never have a boyfriend. On the first day of the new school term, Georgia and her friends Jas, Ellen and Rosie spot fraternal twin brothers Robbie and Tom, who have recently moved to Eastbourne from London.

Georgia and Jas decide to approach the brothers in their mother's organic foodshop, where they work. Jas is quickly enamored with Tom and Georgia strikes up a conversation with Robbie. However, they soon discover that Robbie is dating Lindsay, the most popular girl in school. After learning that Robbie likes cats, Georgia pretends that her cat Angus has gone missing and asks Robbie for help finding him. Jas has Angus on a leash in the park, but he escapes and Tom rescues him just as Georgia and Robbie arrive. Robbie leaves to spend time with Lindsay and Tom asks Jas on a date, after which they become a couple.

Bob moves to New Zealand for a job, while the rest of the family stays in England. During his absence, Connie hires a handsome builder, Jem, to redo the living room, and begins to spend increasingly longer periods of time with him, prompting Georgia to worry about the state of her parents' marriage.

In an attempt to impress Robbie, Georgia takes "snogging lessons" with Peter Dyer, who becomes infatuated with her. When Peter tries to kiss her at a party, he ends up embarrassing her in front of Robbie, Lindsay, Jas and Tom. In order to evade Peter, Georgia lies to him about being a lesbian. When Tom invites Jas to go swimming with him and Robbie, Georgia tags along. While in the pool, Robbie and Georgia kiss. Robbie then leaves, but promises to call Georgia later.

After not hearing from Robbie in a while, Georgia is heartbroken. She decides to make Robbie jealous so that he realises his feelings for her. She invites Robbie's best friend, Dave, to a concert by Robbie's band, the Stiff Dylans. Upon seeing Georgia and Dave dancing and laughing, Robbie tries to talk to her but is stopped by Lindsay.

At school, Dave confronts Georgia about using him to make Robbie jealous. Upon learning what Georgia did to Dave, Robbie severs ties with her. Georgia discovers it was Jas that accidentally leaked this information. After Georgia kicks Jas in the shin during an argument, they vow never to speak to each other again. Shortly afterwards, Robbie tells Georgia he was considering breaking up with Lindsay before becoming involved with her, but now he is disappointed with her recent behaviour.

Devastated, Georgia decides that she would like to move to New Zealand. She stops by her father's workplace and breaks down in tears with a woman who works with him, telling her she does not want her family to be apart from each other. She later goes to the beach, knowing Robbie would be there, and apologises to him. Robbie reveals he ended things with Lindsay and admits he still likes Georgia.

On Georgia's 15th birthday, Connie takes her to a nightclub for the first time. The place initially seems empty, but Georgia's friends and family soon show up to reveal a surprise birthday party, which Jas secretly organised with Connie. Georgia and Jas make amends. Bob returns from New Zealand, deciding to stay in Eastbourne for a better job opportunity, after his boss told him about Georgia's breakdown. It is also revealed that Jem is gay and his boyfriend owns the club. The Stiff Dylans are performing the song "Ultraviolet", which Robbie wrote about Georgia, when they are interrupted by Lindsay, who arrives from her own party (which no one attended) and demands that Robbie choose between her and Georgia. He chooses Georgia, kissing her onstage. Jas pulls out Lindsay's breast pads and tosses them into the crowd, prompting a furious Lindsay to storm off.

Ultimately, Georgia is content with her eccentric family and realises she does not need to change her appearance, as her boyfriend Robbie likes her the way she is.

Cast
 Georgia Groome as Georgia Nicolson: The main character, a 14-year-old girl who falls in love with Robbie and tries to get him to be her boyfriend throughout the film.
 Aaron Johnson as Robbie Jennings: Georgia's love interest, he is in a band called The Stiff Dylans, and is initially Lindsay's boyfriend at the beginning.
 Karen Taylor as Connie Nicolson: Georgia's mother, she is 'old-fashioned', and scares Georgia as it seems she gets very close to Jem, but also attempts to maintains a close relationship with her daughter.
 Alan Davies as Bob Nicolson: Georgia's loving father, who is a bit "old-fashioned" too, as he does not want Georgia to have a party in a club for her birthday. He travels to New Zealand for work which upsets Georgia and her family.
 Eva Drew as Liberty "Libby" Nicolson: Georgia's eccentric 5-year-old younger sister. Likes to dress up her cat Angus.
 Eleanor Tomlinson as Jas: Georgia's best friend, very girlish in understanding, and wants to get a boyfriend just as much as Georgia does. She worries about her lack of ample cleavage. She starts to date Tom, Robbie's fraternal twin brother.
 Manjeeven Grewal as Ellen: Georgia's friend, in 'The Ace gang' along with Georgia, Jas and Rosie. She is the vulnerable one of the group. In the end, she is introduced properly to Dave by Georgia, and they dance together and kiss.
 Georgia Henshaw as Rosie: Georgia's friend, fourth member of 'The Ace gang’. She is the experienced one of the group because she already has a boyfriend called Sven.
 Kimberley Nixon as Lindsay Marlings (Slaggy Lindsay): Georgia's rival, is the main antagonist of the film. She is slim and very good looking but she is a complete bully to Georgia. She is seen as 'the slag of the century'.
 Sean Bourke as Tom Jennings: Robbie's brother, later Jas' boyfriend.
 Tommy Bastow as Dave "The Laugh": Georgia uses Dave to make Robbie jealous, which makes him feel very hurt. Dave is one of Robbie's best friends. He had feelings for Georgia until the party. He then dances with Ellen and they share a kiss.
 Liam Hess as Peter Dyer (Saliva Boy): A charismatic boy in Georgia's class. He gives girls lessons on how to snog, charging five 'quid' for a session. He likes Georgia a lot, though the feeling is not mutual.
 Matt Brinkler as Sven: Rosie's crazy boyfriend, an exchange student from Sweden.
 Steve Jones as Jem: He remodels/decorates a room in Georgia's house and Georgia thinks her mother is falling for him.
 Stiff Dylans as themselves (with the extension of Robbie).
 Ray Shirley as Woman with the Poodle
 Benny & Jimmy as Angus: The cat of titular distinction.

Production
Chadha was originally brought into the project as a scriptwriter:

Most of the scenes were filmed on location in Brighton and Eastbourne. Others, such as the gig scene and some interiors and exteriors for Georgia's house, were filmed in and around Ealing Studios, London. Areas in nearby west London like Bishopshalt school in Hillingdon and the Liquid nightclub in Uxbridge were used as well. Other sites include locations in Teddington and Twickenham. Costumes included green blazers and kilts borrowed from St. Bede's Prep School in Eastbourne, and props included Eastbourne's signature blue bins to add to the effect and continuity when filming in multiple locations.

Release
Angus, Thongs and Perfect Snogging was the first film produced by Nickelodeon Movies to receive a restrictive PG-13 rating.

Reception
The film received positive reviews. Review aggregation website Rotten Tomatoes gives the film an approval rating of 73% based on reviews from 26 critics, with an average score of 5.9/10. The site's critics consensus states: "Based on two of British writer Louise Rennison's popular books, Angus, Thongs and Perfect Snogging is a pleasant and funny tween comedy, comfortable for UK audiences as well as stateside crowds."

Critics noted the strong central performance of Georgia Groome, who was praised for her "super-engaging" performance.

Box office
The film has earned $14,924,919, which includes $10,627,381 (£6.6 million) from the UK alone. The film was in the top 40 in the UK and Ireland and Malta 2008 box office. The film was not released theatrically in the United States, but instead had its U.S. premiere on Nick at Nite and TeenNick and was later was released on DVD.

Music

Some songs played in the film were not included on the soundtrack:
 "Out of Time" - Stiff Dylans
 "You're the Best Thing" – The Style Council
 "Agadoo" – Black Lace
 "True" – Spandau Ballet
 "I'm Your Man" – Shane Richie
 "Mr. Loverman" – Shabba Ranks
 "Dance wiv Me" – Dizzee Rascal featuring Calvin Harris and Chrome
 "Teenage Kicks" – Nouvelle Vague
 "Big Fish, Little Fish" – Nik Martin

References

External links

 
 
 BBC Slink goes behind the scenes of Angus Thongs... A round of up videos from and about the film

2008 films
2008 romantic comedy films
2000s teen comedy films
2000s teen romance films
American romantic comedy films
American teen comedy films
American teen romance films
British romantic comedy films
British teen comedy films
British teen romance films
Confessions of Georgia Nicolson
Films about bullying
Films based on British novels
Films based on multiple works of a series
Films based on young adult literature
Films directed by Gurinder Chadha
Films produced by Lynda Obst
Films set in East Sussex
Films shot in East Sussex
Films shot in London
Films with screenplays by Paul Mayeda Berges
Films with screenplays by Gurinder Chadha
German romantic comedy films
German teen comedy films
Nickelodeon Movies films
2000s English-language films
2000s American films
2000s British films
2000s German films